Wolf-Peter Funk (born 1943 in Oederan, Germany; died February 18, 2021, in Quebec City, Canada) was a historian of religion and Coptologist known for his pioneering studies on Gnosticism, Manichaeism, and Coptic manuscripts such as the Nag Hammadi library.

Biography 
Wolf-Peter Funk was born in 1943 in Oederan, Germany as the only son of Johanna Roeber and Wolfgang Funk.

As a student of Hans-Martin Schenke, Wolf-Peter Funk was one of the founders of the Berlin Working Group for Coptic Gnostic Writings. As part of the research group in Berlin, he translated many texts in the Nag Hammadi library during the 1970s.

In 1986, Funk became a visiting professor in the Faculty of Theology and Religious Studies at Laval University, specializing in Coptic linguistics and biblical and Gnostic literature. At Laval, he worked on the "Bibliothèque copte de Nag Hammadi" (Nag Hammadi Coptic Library) Project, and was later appointed Associate Professor at Laval. He has worked on digital concordances of the Nag Hammadi texts, which were originally stored on floppy disks.

Wolf-Peter Funk has worked on the reconstruction and translation of the Manichaean Coptic manuscripts held at the National Museum of Berlin. He taught Coptic at Laval University until 2009. He has also worked on concordances of the Manichaean Kephalaia and the Manichaean Homilies.

He died from cancer at the Hôpital de l'Enfant-Jésus in Quebec City on February 18, 2021, at the age of 77.

Works (selected) 
Selected works (books authored or with contributed articles):

Translations and concordances 
French translations and concordances published by Laval University Press:

  (BCNH "Textes" no 36)
  (BCNH "Textes" no 35)
  (BCNH "Textes" no 34)
  (BCNH "Textes" no 30)
 
  (BCNH "Textes" no 27)
  (BCNH "Textes" no 28)
  (BCNH "Textes" no 24)

References 

1943 births
2021 deaths
People from Oederan
20th-century German translators
German religion academics
Humboldt University of Berlin alumni
Academic staff of Université Laval
Historians of Gnosticism
Coptologists